Ricardo Moffatti (born 16 December 1986)  is a Paralympic swimming competitor from  Australia. He was born in Mount Isa, Queensland.  He won a bronze medal at the 2004 Athens Games in the Men's 100 m Freestyle S8 event, and a silver medal in the Men's 4 × 100 m Freestyle 34 pts event.  He also competed at the 2008 Summer Paralympics.  Moffatti is from Queensland.

References

Male Paralympic swimmers of Australia
Swimmers at the 2004 Summer Paralympics
Swimmers at the 2008 Summer Paralympics
Paralympic bronze medalists for Australia
Paralympic silver medalists for Australia
Living people#
Medalists at the 2004 Summer Paralympics
1986 births
Living people
Paralympic medalists in swimming
Australian male freestyle swimmers
S8-classified Paralympic swimmers
People from Mount Isa